The Hoboken International Film Festival is an annual festival that promotes domestic and international television pilots, screenplays, non-studio films. Awards, with cash prizes, are given for the best submissions. The festival was founded by Kenneth del Vecchio, who is its chairman. First held in 2005, it is now held at the Thomas Morahan Waterfront Park in Greenwood Lake, New York. It was held first at the Frank Sinatra Park in Hoboken, New Jersey and later in Orange County, New York, including most recently in Middletown, New York.

See also
 Television and film in New Jersey
 Garden State Film Festival
 Golden Door Film Festival
 New Jersey Film Festival

References

External links
 

Film festivals in New Jersey
Hoboken, New Jersey